The space cardioid is a 3-dimensional curve derived from the cardioid. It has a parametric representation using trigonometric functions.

Definition
The general form of the equation is most easily understood in parametric form, as follows:

See also 
Trigonometric functions

References 

Trigonometry
Curves